Portsmouth railway station may refer to:

 Portsmouth Harbour railway station in Hampshire, England
 Portsmouth and Southsea railway station in Hampshire, England
 Portsmouth Arms railway station in Devon, England
 Portsmouth railway station (West Yorkshire), also known as Portsmouth (Lancs) - it was formerly in Lancashire, England and now located in West Yorkshire